Ambu is a village and municipality in the Lerik Rayon of Azerbaijan. It has a population of 791. The municipality consists of the villages of Ambu, Osnağaküçə, and Xəlfəkücə.

References 

Populated places in Lerik District